The South Central Metropolitan Province was a two-member electoral province of the Western Australian Legislative Council, located in metropolitan Perth. It was created by a redistribution in 1982, and took effect on 22 May 1983 following the 1983 state election. It was formed from parts of the South Metropolitan and South-East Metropolitan provinces, and was a safe Liberal seat.

The province had two concurrent members during its brief history — Clive Griffiths and Phillip Pendal, both of the Liberal Party. In 1989, the province was abolished by the Acts Amendment (Electoral Reform) Act 1987, and with two others became part of the five-member South Metropolitan Region under the new proportional voting system. Both the province's members were elected to represent the region.

Geography
The province was made up of several complete Legislative Assembly districts, which changed at each distribution.

Representation

Members

References
 

Former electoral provinces of Western Australia